Eliza Doolittle is an EP by British recording artist Eliza Doolittle. It was released in the UK on 29 November 2009 by digital download.

Track listing 
Digital download

Chart performance

Release history

References

2009 debut EPs
Eliza Doolittle (singer) albums